The road to hell is paved with good intentions is a proverb or aphorism. An alternative form is "Hell is full of good meanings, but heaven is full of good works". 

Another interpretation to consider would be: One is naive and acts in good faith with no altruistic objective. It merely seems as the proper or even sensible thing to do.  In this scenario the act,  regardless of its virtue, leads the actor to unintended negative consequences.

Example: "I took the initiative and replaced the toner in the copy machine, only to be lectured about its poor quality. The boss said we are stuck with using it until the end of the month. I guess the road to hell is paved with good intentions."

Origin
The exact origin of this proverb is unknown and several variations exist. It appeared in full in a London newspaper in 1828 where it was referred to as a Portuguese proverb. It was also published in Henry G. Bohn's A Hand-book of Proverbs in 1855.  

An 1811 English version of one of Rambach's books includes, "The road to hell is paved with good resolutions", a translation of his 1730 German text Der Weg zur Höllen sey mit lauter gutem Vorsatz gepflastert. James Boswell's 1791 biography of Samuel Johnson quotes Johnson as saying to an acquaintance in 1775 "Sir, hell is paved with good intentions." An earlier iteration "borrowed of" another language was "Hell is full of good meanings and wishes" and was published in 1670 in A Collection of English Proverbs collected by John Ray. 

In Franco Zeffirelli's 1968 adaptation of Romeo and Juliet, the character Mercutio says, "The best intentions pave the way to Hell," a line which does not appear in Shakespeare's play.

The earliest known text resembling this phrase occurs in Virgil's Aeneid: "facilis descensus Averno (the descent to hell is easy)".

A resemblance can be found in Ecclesiasticus 21:10, "The way of sinners is made plain with stones, but at the end thereof is the pit of hell." The proverb is commonly misattributed to Bernard of Clairvaux who supposedly wrote ( 1150), "L'enfer est plein de bonnes volontés ou désirs" (hell is full of good wishes or desires). This citation was made in 1640, some five hundred years after his death, and this text has not been found in any of his published works.

Another resemblance also can be found in one Hadith that Muhammad said: "Paradise is surrounded by hardships, and the Fire is surrounded by desires."

John Foxe quotes William Tyndale (1494–1536) as writing "Beware of good intents." The second part of "Chapter 213" of Acts and Monuments cites "Fol. 87" of "The Wicked Mammon".

Meaning
A common meaning of the phrase is that wrongdoings or evil actions are often undertaken with good intentions; or that good intentions, when acted upon, may have unintended consequences. An example is the introduction of invasive species, like Asian carp (bighead, black, grass, and silver carp) imported into the US in the 1970s as a method to control nuisance algal blooms in wastewater treatment plants and aquaculture ponds as well as for human food. Unfortunately, within ten years, the carp escaped confinement and spread to the waters of the Mississippi River basin and other large rivers like the Missouri and Illinois.

A different interpretation of the saying is that individuals may have the intention to undertake good actions but nevertheless fail to take them. This inaction may be due to procrastination, laziness, or other subversive vice. As such, the saying is an admonishment that a good intention is meaningless unless followed through. This is consistent with another saying, "the only thing necessary for evil to win is for good men to do nothing."

Studies
Psychological studies of the effect of intention upon task completion by professors Peter Gollwitzer, Paschal Sheeran and Sheina Orbell indicate that there is some truth in the proverb.  Perfectionists are especially prone to having their intentions backfire in this way.  Some have argued that people are more likely to interpret their own actions as more well-intended than the actions of others.

Attempts to improve the ethical behaviour of groups are often counterproductive.  If legislation is used for such an attempt, people observe the letter of the law rather than improve the desired behaviour. The threat of punishment may make behavior less rather than more ethical.  Studies of business ethics indicate that most wrongdoing is not due directly to wickedness but is performed by people who did not plan to err.

Stephen Garrard Post, writing about altruism, suggests that good intentions are often not what they seem and that mankind normally acts from less worthy, selfish motives—"If the road to hell is paved with good intentions, it is partly because that is the road they generally start out on."

Artistic references
Authors who have used the phrase include Charlotte Brontë, Lord Byron, Randy Travis, Samuel Taylor Coleridge, Sir Walter Scott, Søren Kierkegaard, and Karl Marx. Ozzy Osbourne used the term in the song "Tonight" on his album Diary of a Madman.

In the movie Highway to Hell, the phrase is taken literally to create one particular scene. The Good Intentions Paving Company has a team of Andy Warhols who grind good-intentioned souls into pavement.  "I was only sleeping with my husband's boss to advance his career", says one. The figurative meaning of the phrase is a big part of the plot too, as several characters offer to help the two protagonists on the Road to Hell, but all of them have ulterior motives.

In the Discworld novel Eric by Terry Pratchett, as the wizard Rincewind and teenaged demonologist Eric Thursley escape Pandemonium, they notice that the individual cobbles on the Road to Hell have good intentions written on them. These included "for the good of the kids", "I meant it for the best" and "we are equal opportunities employers".

 Ms. Lauryn Hill used the phrase "See the road to hell is paved with good intentions" in her 2002 song "Mr. Intentional" from her album  MTV Unplugged No. 2.0.

Pink used the phrase in her 2006 song "Dear Mr. President" to refer to the No Child Left Behind Act.

Madonna uses this line in her 2008 single "4 Minutes," featuring Justin Timberlake and Timbaland, off her eleventh studio album Hard Candy.

Bruce Dickinson used this phrase in the song "Road to Hell", from the album Accident of Birth. 

The Chainsmokers utilize this phrase in their song "Good Intentions" featuring BullySongs

The phrase is used in the Star Trek: Deep Space Nine episode "In the Pale Moonlight".

The phrase is also referenced in title card of Gene Roddenberry's Andromeda episode "Forced Perspective".

On the 2021 Foo Fighters album Medicine at Midnight track "Chasing Birds"

The phrase is also used in the 2020 "Living the Dream" by Five Finger Death Punch on their F8 album.

A similar phrase, "our best intentions pave the way to hell", was used in 2013 film Romeo & Juliet by Mercutio after he was stabbed by Tybalt.

This phrase was used in Jurassic Park 3 when Billy steals the raptor eggs to fund his University Department.

The phrase was alluded to in both the title and lyrical poetry in the Joanna Newsom's track "Good Intentions Paving Co." on the 2010 album Have One on Me.

Staind used the phrase in their 2011 song "Something to Remind You".

The beginning of the phrase is seen in the S06, E05 of Peaky Blinders - "The Road to Hell" .

See also

 Do-gooder
 Murphy's law
 Unintended consequences
 No good deed goes unpunished

References

Adages
Hell in popular culture
Intention
Latin proverbs